Hurd Peak is a  mountain summit located one mile east of the crest of the Sierra Nevada mountain range in Inyo County of northern California, United States. Surrounded by lakes, it is situated in the John Muir Wilderness, on land managed by Inyo National Forest.

Etymology
This mountain's toponym was officially adopted in 1920 by the U.S. Board on Geographic Names based on a recommendation by the Sierra Club. It honors the memory of Hurd Clarence Hurd (April 16, 1870 – July 8, 1914), who made the first ascent in 1906 while connected with development work in the vicinity. H. C. Hurd was a civil engineer who received his degree from Princeton University in 1893. He was elected as a member of the American Society of Civil Engineers in 1913, but the following year met an untimely death by accidental drowning in Chesapeake Bay.

Climbing

Established climbing routes on Hurd Peak:

 West Face via Treasure Lakes – 
 East Face – class 3
 South Ridge – class 4
 Northeast Arete – class 5.5
 North Ridge – class 5.7

Climate
According to the Köppen climate classification system, Hurd Peak is located in an alpine climate zone. Most weather fronts originate in the Pacific Ocean, and travel east toward the Sierra Nevada mountains. As fronts approach, they are forced upward by the peaks, causing them to drop their moisture in the form of rain or snowfall onto the range (orographic lift). Precipitation runoff from this mountain drains into the South Fork of Bishop Creek.

Gallery

References

External links

 Weather forecast: Hurd Peak
 Hurd Peak Rock Climbing: Mountainproject.com

Inyo National Forest
Mountains of Inyo County, California
Mountains of the John Muir Wilderness
North American 3000 m summits
Mountains of Northern California
Sierra Nevada (United States)